Islamabad College for Boys (ICB) is the oldest boys college in Islamabad, Pakistan, under the administration of Federal Directorate of Education (FDE). It is situated in Sector G-6/3 near Melody and Siraj Covered Markets.

History
It was established in 1966 during the early years of the city.

ICB conducts classes from class Prep to the Post-Graduate level. For secondary and higher secondary classes, it is affiliated with the Federal Board of Intermediate and Secondary Education, Islamabad. The external exam for degree classes is conducted by the Quaid-i-Azam University, Islamabad.

ICB has over 7,000 students, about 3,500 in the morning and about 3,500 in the evening shift. It has two computer labs, as well as science labs for physics, chemistry, zoology, and botany. There are three libraries. It has three canteens. Formerly, there was a hostel but it was converted into classrooms.

In 2014, ICB became a degree college and started offering four year bachelor's degrees.

In 2020, Government of Pakistan built a gymnasium in the college.
 
Ali Ahmed Kharral serves as the current principal, having been appointed in November 2018.

References

External links 
Official website
Official website of ICBAF

Schools in Islamabad
Educational institutions established in 1968
Boys' schools in Pakistan
1966 establishments in Pakistan